The 1991 Syracuse Orangemen football team represented Syracuse University in the 1991 Division I-A college football season. The Orangemen finished the season 10–2, winning the 1992 Hall of Fame Bowl.

Two new eras began for Syracuse football. It was the first season as head coach for Paul Pasqualoni, who was promoted from assistant after Dick MacPherson, who had led the Orangemen for the previous 11 seasons, left to take the head coaching job at the New England Patriots. More important in the long term, this was the first season in which the Big East Conference sponsored football—although the conference would not establish a full round-robin schedule in the sport until the 1993 season.

Schedule

1991 team players in the NFL

References

Syracuse
Syracuse Orange football seasons
ReliaQuest Bowl champion seasons
Syracuse Orangemen football